Roberto Wallace (born May 10, 1986) is a Panamanian born, former American football wide receiver. He played college football at San Diego State.

College career

Wallace started attending San Diego State University in 2005. He red-shirted his first season as an Aztec and during spring ball had shoulder surgery that withheld him from the 2006 season. In his junior year at SDSU, Wallace was able to see more playing time on the field. He played in his first career games against Washington State and ASU but did not log a reception. His first career catch came in the win over PSU for nine receiving yards. Starting against New Mexico, Wallace recorded a career-best three catches for 20 yards. Quickly after, he had a career-best 2 catches for 43 yards, including a long of 31. By the end of the season, Wallace had tallied his first six catches of his career for 72 yards.

As he did in high school, Wallace grew as a player going into his senior season and started in 9 of the 11 games he played in. In the season opener against Cal Poly, Wallace had two catches including his first career touchdown. He again set a career best with four catches against Notre Dame with 40 yards and a long of 14. After one catch against San Jose State, Wallace had three catches for a career-best 47 yards with a long of 22 yards in the win over Idaho. The career-long 34-yard catch at TCU, two catches for 27 yards against New Mexico, and the two catches for 30 yards against Colorado State led to a breakout performance at Wyoming. He had career bests in both yards and catches with 7 catches for 66 yards. As the Mountain West Conference play was coming to an end, Wallace had four catches at BYU and three for 47 yards against No. 8 Utah. In his last game, he made two catches for 33 yards in a win over UNLV. He was awarded 2008 most improved offensive player for his senior season. On May 22, 2010, Wallace finished school at San Diego State and graduated with a sociology degree.

Professional career

Miami Dolphins
After going undrafted in the 2010 NFL Draft. Wallace was signed by the Miami Dolphins as an undrafted free agent in 2010.  He was subsequently cut from the team on August 31, 2012.

Tennessee Titans
On January 14, 2013, Wallace was signed by the Tennessee Titans. On August 26, 2013, he was waived by the Titans.

Montreal Alouettes
On September 12, 2013, Wallace signed a two-year contract with the Montreal Alouettes of the Canadian Football League.

References

External links
Miami Dolphins bio
Montreal Alouettes bio
San Diego State Aztecs bio 
Tennessee Titans bio 

1986 births
Living people
American football wide receivers
Panamanian emigrants to the United States
San Diego State Aztecs football players
Miami Dolphins players